National Museum of Antiquities may refer to:

 National Museum of Antiquities (France), in Saint-Germain-en-Laye, France
 National Museum of Antiquities (Netherlands), in Leiden, Netherlands
 National Museum of Antiquities (Scotland), in Edinburgh, Scotland

See also
 Museum of Antiquities (disambiguation)